Eastgate Mall, or Eastgate Shopping Centre, or similar, may refer to:

 Eastgate Centre, Harare, Zimbabwe
 Eastgate Mall (Chattanooga), Tennessee, U.S.
 Eastgate Mall (Cincinnati), Ohio, U.S.
 Eastgate Mall over I-805 Bridge, San Diego County, California, U.S.
 Eastgate Shopping Centre (Basildon), Essex, England
 Eastgate Shopping Centre (Bondi Junction), New South Wales, Australia
 Eastgate Shopping Centre, Gloucester, England
 Eastgate Shopping Centre (Inverness), Scotland
 Eastgate Shopping Centre, Johannesburg, South Africa
 Eastgate Square, a shopping center in Hamilton, Ontario, Canada
 Sherwood Park Mall, formerly Eastgate Mall, Sherwood Park, Alberta, Canada

See also
 Eastgate (disambiguation)